The Theatre Union of Ukraine is an independent public union of theatre professionals in Ukraine.  The union is a member of ITI (International Theatre Institute) under UNESCO.

Theatre in Ukraine
Cultural organizations based in Ukraine